Computer University, Bhamo is a university located in Bhamo, Kachin State of  Myanmar.

External links
Official site

Technological universities in Myanmar